The 2010 e-Boks Sony Ericsson Open was the first edition of the tennis tournament e-Boks Danish Open, an International-level tournament on the 2010 WTA Tour. It took place on indoor hard courts in Farum, Denmark from August 2 to August 8, 2010. The Danish top player Caroline Wozniacki won the singles title.

WTA entrants

Seeds

 Seedings are based on the rankings of July 19, 2010.

Other entrants
The following players received wildcards into the singles main draw:
  Malou Ejdesgaard
  Kristýna Plíšková
  Katarina Srebotnik

The following players received entry from the qualifying draw:
  Elena Bovina (as a Lucky loser)
  Anna Chakvetadze
  Marta Domachowska
  Alexa Glatch
  Anna-Lena Grönefeld

Finals

Singles

 Caroline Wozniacki defeated  Klára Zakopalová 6–2, 7–6(5)
 It was Wozniacki's second title of the year and eighth of her career.

Doubles

 Julia Görges /  Anna-Lena Grönefeld defeated  Vitalia Diatchenko /  Tatiana Poutchek, 6–4, 6–4

References

2010 Sony Ericsson WTA Tour Calendar (PDF).
CoreTennis: e-boks Danish Open.
"Pro tennis arrives in Denmark". The Copenhagen Post, 17 September 2009.

External links 
 

E-Boks Danish Open
2010 E-Boks Danish Open
2010 in Danish tennis